Hanefi Mahçiçek (stadium) was built in 2001 and has a capacity of 12,000. It is located in Kahramanmaraş in south-east Turkey. The stadium is used by Kahramanmaraşspor football club. The stadium is named after the club's ex-chairman and Kahramanmaraş's ex-mayor Hanefi Mahçiçek.

During the 2023 Kahramanmaraş Earthquake the stadium was used as an aid distribution point.

References

External links
Unofficial web site

Football venues in Turkey
Sports venues completed in 2001
Buildings and structures in Kahramanmaraş Province
Kahramanmaraşspor